Toga se niko nije setio (translation: No one thought of that) is a quiz show produced by Prva Srpska Televizija. The show is unique because it tasks players with finding obscure answers to questions and trying to obtain a low score. It started airing on April 5, 2014. The show is the local version of Pointless, produced by Endemol UK.

Overview

Toga se niko nije setio is a quiz show in which players are tasked with not only finding correct answers, but finding the most obscure answers among them. The game features four teams, each consisting of two players. Players must try and survive being eliminated by obtaining the lowest score and make it to the final round for a chance to win the jackpot prize. Teams can appear on the show up to two times, the exception being if they have made it to the final round on their first attempt.Prior to the show, 100 people are each given 100 seconds to give as many answers as they can to the questions that will be asked to the teams during the show. Correct answers are assigned a point value equal to the number of panelists who gave them, so that less commonly given answers have lower values than those given by many panelists. Incorrect answers incur a penalty of 100 points. Players on the show attempt to give answers worth as few points as possible, aiming to have the lowest score amongst the players in each round.

Celebrity edition
First two episodes were celebrity editions. First winners were actors Aleksandar Radojičić and Viktor Savić, who donated 60,000 RSD to the "Boško Buha" theater.

Prize
The winner gets 20,000 RSD. The jackpot prize is 50,000 RSD, but when someone guesses the "pointless answer", 5000 RSD are added to the jackpot.
First jackpot winners were Aleksandar Radojičić and Viktor Savić, who won 60,000 RSD for charity.

If the jackpot is not won in one episode, it goes to the next one, so the next jackpot will be 50,000 RSD, plus jackpot from previous episode.

Largest jackpot was won on April 26, 2014, by Dragan & Branka. The jackpot prize was 170,000 RSD.

Seasons

Season 1

 Celebrity edition
 Jackpot winners

References

Serbian game shows
2014 Serbian television series debuts
Pointless
Prva Srpska Televizija original programming
Non-British television series based on British television series